Hellen Toncio (born April 17, 1994) is a Chilean volleyball player and beauty pageant titleholder who was crowned Miss Universo Chile 2014 and represented Chile at the Miss Universe 2014.

Early life
Hellen is an odontology student and a volleyball player in Chile.

Pageantry

Miss Universo Chile 2014
Hellen was crowned as Miss Universo Chile 2014 and represented O'Higgins.

Miss Universe 2014
Hellen represented Chile at Miss Universe 2014 in United States but Unplaced.

References

External links
 Official Miss Universo Chile
 Hellen Toncio, Official Profile in MissUniverse.com

1994 births
Living people
People from Rancagua
Miss Universe 2014 contestants
Miss Universo Chile winners
Chilean female models